Donghae Expressway is an expressway in South Korea, connecting Busan to Sokcho. It is numbered 65 and it is planned to eventually extend all the way along the east coast to Haeundae, Busan.

In 1966. the South Korean Government and IBRD investigated about Gangwon Province, and decided to construct a new Industrial road that connected Sokcho, Gangneung and Samcheok. In 1971, the Government decided to construct Gangneung–Mukho (Donghae City) Section. This expressway was the seventh highway opened in South Korea.

This expressway will connect with Wonsan-Geumgangsan Expressway (원산금강산고속도로) and Wonsan-Hamheung Expressway after Korean reunification.

History 
 26 March 1974: Construction Began
 14 October 1975: Mojeon–Donghae segment opens to traffic (2 lanes)
 11 July 1986: Construction started on Jukheon–Mojeon segment
 15 December 1988: Jukheon–Donghae segment opens to traffic (2 lanes)
 20 August 1999: Work begins to widen to 4 lanes on Hyeonnam–Donghae segment
 November 2001: Construction begins on Haeundae–Ulsan section
 26 November 2001: Hyeonnam–Gangneung segment opens to traffic (4 lanes)
 24 November 2004: Gangneung–Donahae Segment opens to traffic (4 lanes)
 December 2004: Construction begins between Hyeonnam and Sokcho
 29 December 2008: Haeundae–Ulsan segment opens to traffic (6 lanes)
 31 March 2009: Construction begins on Donghae–S.Samcheok section
 June 2009: Construction begins on Ulsan–Pohang segment
 27 December 2009: Hyeonnam–Hajodae segment opens to traffic
 21 December 2012: Hajodae–Yangyang segment opens to traffic
 29 December 2015: Ulsan–S.Gyeongju segment opens to traffic
 29 December 2015: W.Gyeongju–S.Pohang segment opens to traffic
 30 June 2016: S.Gyeongju–W.Gyeongju segment opens to traffic
 9 September 2016: Donghae–S.Samcheok segment opens to traffic
 24 November 2016: Yangyang–Sokcho segment opens to traffic
 2020: Pohang–S.Samcheok segment will open to traffic

Information

Lanes 
 Samcheok–Donghae, Jumunjin- Sokcho (68 km, rigid pavement) Busan–Songjeong IC, Donghae IC – Gangneung IC, Gangneung JC – Yangyang IC: 4
 Songjeong IC – Ulsan JC, Gangneung IC – Gangneung JC: 6

Lengths 
 Busan–Pohang:Rigid Pavement 
 Samcheok–Donghae Rigid Pavement (20.5 km, or 12.73 mi), Jumunjin-Sokcho (rigid pavement, 18.3 km, or 11.37 mi)
 Total:

Speed limit 
 All segments of Donghae Expressway have a speed limit of 100 km/h

List of facilities 

 IC: Interchange, JC: Junction, SA: Service Area, TG:Tollgate
 (■): Busan-Ulsan Expressway ( Section)
 (■): section of Yeongil Bay Bridge

See also 
 Roads and expressways in South Korea
 Transportation in South Korea

External links 
 MOLIT South Korean Government Transport Department

Expressways in South Korea
Roads in Busan
Roads in Ulsan
Roads in North Gyeongsang
Roads in Gangwon